Baltimore Light RailLink (formerly Baltimore Light Rail, and also known simply as the "Light Rail") is a light rail system serving Baltimore, Maryland, United States, as well as its surrounding suburbs. It is operated by the Maryland Transit Administration (MTA Maryland). In downtown Baltimore, it uses city streets. Outside the central portions of the city, the line is built on private rights-of-way, mostly from the defunct Northern Central Railway, Baltimore and Annapolis Railroad and Washington, Baltimore and Annapolis Electric Railway.

History

Initial segment 

The origins of Light RailLink lie in a 1966 Baltimore area transit plan that envisioned six rapid transit lines radiating from the city center. By 1983, only one of the plan's lines—the "Northwest" line—had been built, becoming the Baltimore Metro Subway. Much of the plan's "North" and "South" lines ran along right-of-way that was once used by interurban streetcar and commuter rail routes—the Northern Central Railway, Washington, Baltimore and Annapolis Electric Railway and Baltimore and Annapolis Railroad—that still remained available for transit development.

Beginning in the late 1980s, former Baltimore mayor and then Maryland Governor William Donald Schaefer pushed for a transit line along the plan's "North" and "South" corridors, motivated in part by a desire to establish a rail transit link to the new downtown baseball park being built at Camden Yards for the Baltimore Orioles. Light RailLink was built quickly and inexpensively without federal funds, the latter a rarity in late 20th century U.S. transit projects. The initial system was a single  line, all at-grade except for a bridge over the Middle Branch of the Patapsco River just south of downtown Baltimore. The line ran from Timonium in Baltimore County in the north to Glen Burnie in Anne Arundel County in the south.

The line opened in stages over a 14-month period. The initial segment from Timonium to Camden Yards opened for limited service for Orioles games on April 2, 1992, and for full service on May 17. A three-station extension to Patapsco opened on August 20, 1992, followed by a 4-station extension to Linthicum on April 2, 1993, and an additional 2-station extension to Glen Burnie on May 20, 1993.

Station placement and design were intended to be flexible and change over time, as stations could be built or closed at low cost. However, they were at times dictated by politics rather planning: proposed stops in Ruxton, Riderwood, and Village of Cross Keys were not built due to local opposition, while  Mt. Royal and Timonium Business Park stations were built because the University of Baltimore and a local business group funded them. Falls Road station was built with less parking than ridership required because community requests and a fence—erected in response to a homeowner objecting to the visual impact of the station—prevented riders from accessing a nearby commercial building.

Expansion 
Three extensions to the system were added in 1997. On September 9, the line was extended north  to Hunt Valley, adding five stations that served a major business park and a mall. On December 6, two short but important branches were added to the system: a  spur in Baltimore that provided a link to the Penn Station intercity rail hub, and a  spur to the terminal of BWI Airport.

On September 6, 1998, the Hamburg Street station opened as an infill station between the existing Westport and Camden Yards stations. Adjacent to M&T Bank Stadium, it was initially only open during Ravens games and other major stadium events; however, it became a full-time stop on July 1, 2005.

To save money, much of the system was built with only a single track. While this allowed the system to be constructed and opened quickly, it limited the system's flexibility: much of the line was restricted to 17-minute headways, with no way to reduce headways during peak hours. Federal money was acquired to double track the vast majority of the system; much of the line south of downtown Baltimore was shut down in 2004 and north of downtown shut down in 2005 in order to complete this project.  The northern section up to Timonium reopened in December 2005; the rest opened in February 2006. The line north of the Gilroy Road station and the BWI Airport spur remain single tracked.

Incidents 
On July 10, 2019, part of the northbound platform at Convention Center station fell into a sinkhole caused by a broken water main. The line was closed between Camden and North Avenue until August 19.

Operation

Routing and schedules 

The Light RailLink system consists of a main north–south line on which 28 of the system's 33 stops are located. There are two branches on the southern end to BWI Airport and Glen Burnie that have two stations each and one spur in Baltimore City for Penn Station that can only be entered heading north and exited heading south. There are still single-track sections north of Timonium, where headways are limited to 15 minutes.

The Light RailLink system has two train runs. One runs the full length of the main line between Hunt Valley and either BWI Airport or Glen Burnie, alternating between the two every other trip, with some off-peak trains originating or terminating at either North Avenue or Fairgrounds instead of Hunt Valley. The other—the Penn-Camden Shuttle—only runs through downtown between Penn Station and Camden Station.

The light rail operates 4:00 a.m.–12:45 a.m. on weekdays, 4:15 a.m.–12:45 a.m. Saturdays, and 10 a.m.–10 p.m. on Sundays and major holidays. At peak hours on weekdays (from the first trains of the day until 10 a.m., and from 4 p.m. to 6 p.m.), the BWI–Hunt Valley and Glen Burnie–Fairgrounds routes see 20-minute headways; at other times on weekdays and all day on weekends, there are 30-minute headways on both routes (with Glen Burnie trains traveling all the way to Hunt Valley). The Camden Yards-Penn Station route sees 30-minute headways at all times. Because there is significant overlap on these routes, most of the system sees 10-minute peak and 15-minute off-peak headways; stations in the downtown section between Mt. Royal and Camden Yards are served by six trains an hour off-peak and eight trains an hour at peak. (Paradoxically, the Fairgrounds-Hunt Valley section actually sees longer headways at peak hours.)

Most of the light rail's route is on dedicated right-of-way that has grade crossings equipped with crossing gates. The remainder of the route in downtown Baltimore between Camden Station and Mt. Royal/MICA uses shared right of way on Howard Street, where trains mix with automobile traffic and their movement is controlled by traffic signals. In 2007, a transit signal priority system was implemented on this section, resulting in time savings of 25%. From south of Falls Road to North Avenue, the light rail runs parallel to the Jones Falls Expressway, and from Camden Yards to north of Westport, it parallels Interstate 395. North of Falls Road and south of Westport, it follows its own path towards its respective termini.

Fares and transit connections 
MTA fares are identical for the Metro Subway, Light RailLink, and local buses: a one-way trip costs $1.90.  Daily, weekly, and monthly unlimited-ride passes are also available that are good on all three transit modes. A passenger with a one-way ticket can change Light Rail trains if necessary to complete their journey, the only instance of a one-way MTA ticket being good for a ride on more than one vehicle, but transferring to a bus or the Metro Subway requires a new one-way fare or a pass. Automated ticket vending machines that sell tickets and passes are available at all Light Rail stations.

The Light Rail's ticketing is based on a proof-of-payment system. Passengers must have a ticket or pass before boarding. Maryland Transit Administration Police officers ride some trains and randomly check passengers to make sure that they are carrying a valid ticket or pass and can issue criminal citations for those without one. Civilian Fare Inspectors also conduct ticket checks, alighting those without fare.

Most Light Rail stations are served by several MTA bus routes and passengers can make platform-to-platform transfers with the MARC Camden Line at Camden Yards and with the MARC Penn Line at Penn Station. There are no cross-platform connections with the Metro Subway. The Lexington Market subway and light rail stations are a block apart and connected only via surface streets.

Ridership 

 FY 2011 – 27,595 average weekday; 8,655,209 annual
 FY 2012 – 27,253 average weekday; 8,539,996 annual
 FY 2013 – 27,537 average weekday; 8,647,381 annual
 FY 2014 – 25,183 average weekday; 8,105,743 annual

Rolling stock 

Baltimore's Light Rail vehicles (LRVs) were built by ABB Traction, the U.S. division of ABB. The initial set was delivered in 1991–1992 as the line was being built; a supplemental order of essentially identical cars built by local AAI Corporation was delivered in 1997 when the extensions came into service.

Baltimore LRVs are quite large, much larger than traditional streetcars and bigger even than those used on San Francisco's Muni Metro or Boston's Green Line. These cars operate on  track. One-, two- and three-car trains are all routinely seen in service. When delivered, they were the first transit vehicles in the United States to employ A/C propulsion. Each LRV is powered by four  motors ( total); the middle truck is unpowered.

The MTA currently owns 53 individual light rail cars. During typical weekday peak-time service, approximately 30 to 35 cars are required; a somewhat higher number of cars are put into service immediately after Orioles and Ravens games. For weekday service, as well as on days of Orioles games or events at the Royal Farms Arena or Baltimore Convention Center, trains going from Hunt Valley to Cromwell and BWI Airport are generally run with two cars, while three-car trains are put into service for Ravens games and major downtown events. Usually the Penn Station-Camden Yards shuttle is operated with one-car trains. The MTA also owns a variety of maintenance of way equipment, which can use diesel power in emergencies.

A mid-life upgrade of the light rail vehicles began in 2013. On September 9, 2013, a contract for mid-life overhauls of the light rail vehicles was awarded to Alstom. Five vehicles at a time were sent for rebuilding, involving testing, removal of all interior and exterior components and replacement with new propulsion systems. The overhaul is scheduled for completion in March 2018. The overhauled cars began testing in early 2016. By 2021 the original order of ABB vehicles had their interiors upgrades with security cameras, LED lighting, and LCD displays that show the trains progress throughout the line and next station.

Future 
While there are several plans and proposals to expand the system, none are approved or funded. An independent commission on Baltimore-area transit made a number of suggestions in a 2002 report for new lines and expansions of existing lines. Newer proposals include expanding service on the existing Central Light Rail line by extending Sunday service via the BaltimoreLink plan, as well as new stations and spurs.

Texas station 

There are plans to add an infill station at Texas, between the existing Timonium and Warren Road stations in Cockeysville. An island was built at this point on the line in conjunction with the 2005 double-tracking work to provide a turn-back point for trains not going all the way to Hunt Valley; it would also be relatively simple to convert this into a revenue station.

Stockholm Street station 
In the 2015 South Baltimore Gateway Masterplan, the city of Baltimore proposed a new light rail stop along the Central Light Rail line at Stockholm Street, in between Hamburg Street Station and Westport Station. The new station would be located near the also-proposed new station for the MARC Train located west of Russell Street. The new station will provide additional access to the Baltimore Greyhound Bus Terminal, the Horseshoe Casino, and new businesses in the Carroll-Camden Industrial Area.

Port Covington extension 
In January 2016, plans were unveiled by Sagamore Development Company, owned by Under Armour CEO Kevin Plank, regarding the redevelopment of Port Covington in South Baltimore. The new plan for Port Covington calls for two proposed new light rail stations, along with new residential and commercial development. The first station would be located west of Hanover Street, and the other would be located at the intersection of East McComas Street and East Cromwell Street, just south of Federal Hill. This proposed extension would create a new spur from the Central Light Rail line by crossing the Middle Branch of the Patapsco River south of Interstate 95.

Low floor vehicles 
The MTA plans to transition the system from high floor vehicles to low floor LRVs and requested information from low-floor LRV vendors in January 2023.

Red Line 

The Red Line was a planned , 19-station light rail line traveling east–west that would intersect with the existing Light Rail downtown; this would be a separate service, with no track connection to the existing Light Rail, though there would be opportunities for transfer between the two in the vicinity of University Center / Baltimore Street.

See also 

 Baltimore Metro Subway
 List of Baltimore Light Rail stations
 Light rail in the United States
 List of United States light rail systems by ridership
 List of tram and light rail transit systems
 List of rail transit systems in the United States

References

External links 

Light RailLink at MTA Maryland
Scott Kozel's Baltimore Light Rail pages

BWI
Light rail in Maryland
Maryland Transit Administration
Railway lines opened in 1992
1992 establishments in Maryland
750 V DC railway electrification